Jan Sehn (April 22, 1909 – December 12, 1965), was a Polish lawyer, 1945-1947 investigating magistrate, and professor at Jagiellonian University since 1961. He was member of the Commission for the Investigation of Nazi War Crimes, and Chairman of the Kraków District Commission until 1953. In 1945 and 1946, he led the investigations on the site of the Nazi concentration camp Auschwitz-Birkenau. As an investigation judge he prepared the accusation act of the former camp commandant Rudolf Höß. From 1949 director of the Institute of Forensic Research in Kraków. Sehn died suddenly 1965 in Frankfurt.

In 1966 Institute of Forensic Research in Kraków was named after Jan Sehn.

He was the cousin of Wanda Szczerba (1910–1998), who was married to engineer and technical director of Fablok Klemens Stefan Sielecki (1903–1980).

Selected publications 
Wspomnienia Rudolfa Hoessa komendanta obozu oświęcimskiego, ed. Jan Sehn, Warsaw, 1960.
Konzentrationslager Oswiecim-Brzezinka (Auschwitz-Birkenau), Warsaw, 1957.

1909 births
1965 deaths
Academic staff of Jagiellonian University
20th-century Polish lawyers